Cydalima joiceyi is a moth in the family Crambidae. It was described by Anthonie Johannes Theodorus Janse in 1924. It is found on Seram in Indonesia.

References

Moths described in 1924
Spilomelinae